This is a list of episodes for the Japanese anime television series Den-noh Coil. It aired in Japan between 12 May and 1 December 2007, containing twenty-six episodes.

Episode list

References

External links
 
Den-noh Coil at NHK website 

Den-noh Coil